The Hadiach Regiment was one of then territorial-administrative subdivisions of the Cossack Hetmanate. The regiment's capital was the city of Hadiach, now in Poltava Oblast of central Ukraine.

The Hadiach Regiment was founded in 1648. In 1649 the regiment became part of Poltava Regiment.

Under the hetman Ivan Briukhovetsky, Hadiach county became a new Zinkivskyi Regiment.

During the early years of the 1670s the Regiment was renamed Hadiach Regiment. During different years of its existence the regiment was composed of 9 to 18 sotnias. The regiment also had Cossack artillery. On the territories of the regiment were 11 cities and 971 villages.

In 1782 the regiment was disbanded by the order of the Tsar. All of the regiment's territories were included into the Chernigov Viceroyalty.

Structure
In 1782 there were 18 sotnias in the regiment:
Hadiach (3)
Opposhanska (3)
Zinkivsk (3)
Komyshancka (2)
Kovalivska (2)
Veprytska
Hrunska
Kyzemynska
Rashivska
Lutenska

Commanders
List of Regiment Colonels:
Yarema Khmelenko (1648) 
Kindrat Burlii (1648–1649)
Pavlo Apostol (Tsarenko, silmutaniously Myrhorod colonel, 1659–60)
Vasyl Shyman (1662–1663)
Semen Ostrenko (1666–1668, 1672)
Yakiv Tyshchenko (1670–1672)
Fedir Krynytskyi (1672–1678)
Mykhailo Samoilovych (1678–1687)
Mykhailo Borokhovych (1687–1704)
Stepan Troshchynskyi (1705–1709)
Ivan Charnysh (1709–1714)
Mykhailo Myloradovych (1715–1726)
Havrylo Myloradovych (1727–1729)
Hryhorii Hrabianka (1730–1738)
Petro Haletskyi (1738–1754)
Vasyl Rozumovskyi (1755–1762)
Antin Kryzhanivskyi (1762–1772)
Semen Myloradovych (1778)
Rodion Plamenets (~1790)

References

Cossack Hetmanate Regiments
History of Poltava Oblast
1648 establishments in the Polish–Lithuanian Commonwealth